"L'Or de nos vies" is a 2006 charity single written by French rock band Kyo and its lead singer Benoît Poher and produced by Kyo and François Delabrière. The song was interpreted by a French music collective called Fight Aids.

Charity
The revenues from the sale of the single and downloads was donated to F.A.M. (Fight Aids Monaco) charity, in support of building a house called "maison de vie" (house of life) near Avignon.

Music video and documentary
The music video was shot on 20 June 2006 on Charles Floquet Avenue in Paris, very near Eiffel Tower, in presence of all the artists and 300 other participants. The video shows a very small group of people (representing people with AIDS and their sympathizers) deciding to walk in defiance against the current of one-way pedestrians (representing indifference in society). But little by little, pedestrians decide to join in those defiant few and eventually all are walking in the direction of the AIDS activists in a march of unity and solidarity.

Documentary (making of)
NRJ 12 also broadcast on 15 August 2006, a 24-minute documentary about "making of" of the music video and interviews with participating artists.

Participating artists
A great number of artists took part (listed in alphabetical order): 
Anggun
Bénabar
Amel Bent
Patrick Bruel
Corneille
Emma Daumas
Jenifer
Kyo
Leslie
Emmanuel Moire
M. Pokora
Roch Voisine
Stéphanie de Monaco
Tété

Charts
The song released on 28 July 2006 received wide media coverage and reached number 5 in SNEP, the French singles chart.

References

External links
Fight Aids VEVO channel

2006 singles
French-language songs
Charity singles
2006 songs
Songs written by Benoît Poher